Chandra Parbat I is a mountain of the Garhwal Himalaya in Uttarakhand, India. It is 42nd highest located entirely within the Uttrakhand. Nanda Devi, is the highest mountain in this category. Chandra Parbat I lies on the eastern bank of the Suralaya Glacier. It is located in between Chandra II (North west) and Chandra III (South). It is located 4.9 km NE of Satopanth  and 8 km west lies Vasuki South . On the 7.4 km SWS lies the Swachhand Peak  and Bhgirathi Massif on the west side.

Climbing History
An  Australian team of eight member climbed the Chandra Parbat I (6739 meters, 22,110 feet) On September 25, 1994. The team members are Darren Miller,  Gavin Dunmall, Glen Tempest, James Serie, Peter Williams, Andrew McNeill, Grant Else and Sarah Boyle. They established their Base Camp below Vasuki Parbat and Advance Base at the junction of the Chaturangi and Suralaya Glaciers. They climbed the 70° northwest face to the summit. Darren Miller made a route up the ridge and then up the face to the left of the Tempest-Serle route. On September 25, they climbed a steep rock until the snow line at 6200 meters. At 5:45 they were on the summit.

Glaciers and rivers

It is surrounded by glaciers on both the sides Suralaya Glacier on the western side, sweta Bamak on the eastern side, Both the glacier joins with Chaturangi Glacier and Chaturangi Glacier joins with Gangotri Glacier from there emerges the river Bhagirathi the main tributaries of river Ganga.

Neighboring peaks

Neighboring peaks of Chandra Parbat I:

 Mana Parbat I:  
 Mana Parbat II: 
 Kalindi peak: 
 Pilapani Parbat: 
 Satopanth:

See also

 List of Himalayan peaks of Uttarakhand

References

Mountains of Uttarakhand
Six-thousanders of the Himalayas
Geography of Chamoli district